The 2022–23 season is the 118th in the history of SC Bastia and their second consecutive season in the second division. The club will participate in Ligue 2 and Coupe de France.

Players

Transfers

Pre-season and friendlies

Competitions

Overall record

Ligue 2

League table

Results summary

Results by round

Matches 
The league fixtures were announced on 17 June 2022.

Coupe de France

References 

SC Bastia seasons
Bastia